The Oakey Power Station is a 282 MW power station located at Oakey on the Darling Downs in southern Queensland, adjacent to the Roma to Brisbane Pipeline. The station is an open-cycle, dual liquid/gas-fired power station that typically operates during times of peak electricity demand when Queensland's power needs are greatest. ERM Power led the development of Oakey with commissioning occurring safely and on time in December 1999. ERM Power owns 100% of Oakey and also operates and financially manages the power station.

See also 

 List of fuel oil power stations
 List of power stations in Australia

References 

Natural gas-fired power stations in Queensland
Darling Downs
1999 establishments in Australia
Energy infrastructure completed in 1999